German submarine U-1226 was a Type IXC/40 U-boat of Nazi Germany's Kriegsmarine during World War II.

The U-boat, built for service in the Battle of the Atlantic, was completed in Hamburg in November 1943, and placed under the command of Oberleutnant zur See August-Wilhem Claussen (Crew X/37), whose brother Emil had been killed on board  the previous year. She underwent working up cruises in the Baltic Sea before embarking on her only operational patrol from Horten Naval Base in Norway during September 1944.

Design
German Type IXC/40 submarines were slightly larger than the original Type IXCs. U-1226 had a displacement of  when at the surface and  while submerged. She had two shafts and two  propellers.

U-1226 was fitted with six  torpedo tubes (four fitted at the bow and two at the stern), 22 torpedoes, one  SK C/32 naval gun, 180 rounds, and a  Flak M42 as well as two twin  C/30 anti-aircraft guns. The boat had a complement of forty-eight.

Service history

This patrol was uneventful for the first three weeks during the Atlantic crossing as she deliberately avoided the highly-effective allied countermeasures. The last contact with the boat was on 23 October 1944 reporting trouble with its Schnorchel underwater-breathing apparatus after which nothing more was heard from her. It is possible she was sunk in an unrecorded encounter with an Allied ship or aircraft, or more likely she suffered some unknown catastrophic accident which claimed the boat and all its crew.

Whatever the cause, she was given up for lost in mid-November. Her remains were claimed to have been found east of Cape Cod, Massachusetts in 1993 however, this identification is unlikely.

References

Bibliography

External links

Missing U-boats of World War II
Ships built in Hamburg
German Type IX submarines
U-boats commissioned in 1943
U-boats sunk in 1944
Shipwrecks of the Massachusetts coast
World War II shipwrecks in the Atlantic Ocean
World War II submarines of Germany
1943 ships
U-boats sunk by unknown causes
Maritime incidents in October 1944